Here We Go Again is the third and final studio album by rock band SR-71, recorded during 2003 and released on May 21, 2004. It wasn't released outside Japan, although it was available on the band's website through a Japanese import.

On November 26, 2010, the album was finally released in the United States, more than six years after its initial release in Japan in May 2004, after being recorded during 2003. The North American version is available through iTunes, Amazon.com MP3, and other digital retailers and has all the tracks remastered, as well as 3 additional live bonus tracks, and a different track list order.

Track listing

 "Little Asshole" starts at 3:07 of "She Was Dead"

Personnel
Mitch Allan – lead vocals, rhythm guitar
Pat DeMent – lead guitar, backing vocals
Mike Ruocco – bass, backing vocals
John Allen – drums, percussion, backing vocals, lead vocals on "15 Minute Idol"

Release history

Trivia
 "1985" was covered, with slightly reworked lyrics, by Bowling for Soup for their 2004 album A Hangover You Don't Deserve. It was released as a single and achieved good chart ratings. SR-71's frontman, Mitch Allan, appeared in the music video for the song.
 "Here We Go Again" was covered and re-recorded by alternative pop punk band JParis for their second album Call It What You Want in 2006, an album which was produced by Mitch Allan.
 A CD single was made for the song "Axl Rose", and was available through the band's website. "Here We Go Again", "All American" and a censored version of "All American" were the b-side tracks. 
 A follow-up album is not expected by the band, due to other projects. Mitch Allan hoped to release his solo album in 2008, but it was delayed ever since. According to Mitch Allan's Myspace page, it is known for now that the song "Mosquito" from this album will be also featured on Mitch Allan's solo album.
 At the time of the release of the album, former bassist Jeff Reid had lung cancer, and died weeks later, on June 11.

References

2004 albums
SR-71 (band) albums